This page indexes the individual year in art pages; see also art periods. This list is exclusively for the visual arts; for music, see Timeline of musical events.


Prehistoric – 1000s – 1010s – 1020s – 1030s – 1040s – 1050s – 1060s – 1070s – 1080s – 1090s – 1100s – 1110s – 1120s – 1130s – 1140s – 1150s – 1160s – 1170s – 1180s – 1190s – 1200s – 1210s – 1220s – 1230s – 1240s – 1250s – 1260s – 1270s – 1280s – 1290s – 1300s – 1310s – 1320s – 1330s – 1340s – 1350s – 1360s – 1370s – 1380s – 1390s – 1400s – 1410s – 1420s – 1430s – 1440s – 1450s – 1460s – 1470s – 1480s – 1490s – 1500s – 1510s – 1520s – 1530s – 1540s – 1550s – 1560s – 1570s – 1580s – 1590s – 1600s – 1610s – 1620s – 1630s – 1640s – 1650s – 1660s – 1670s – 1680s – 1690s – 1700s – 1710s – 1720s – 1730s – 1740s – 1750s – 1760s – 1770s – 1780s – 1790s – 1800s – 1810s – 1820s – 1830s – 1840s – 1850s – 1860s – 1870s – 1880s – 1890s – 1900s – 1910s – 1920s – 1930s – 1940s – 1950s – 1960s – 1970s – 1980s – 1990s – 2000s – 2010s – 2020s

2020s 
2023 in art -  Death of Marilyn Stafford, Zhou Lingzhao, Lyuben Zidarov, Karim Bennani, Michael Snow, George S. Zimbel, Hans Belting, Nicola Zamboni, Alfred Leslie, Jesse Treviño, Ángela Gurría, Ans Westra, Mary Bauermeister, Camille Souter, Rafael Viñoly, Lou Stovall, Piero Gilardi, Ian Falconer, Phyllida Barlow, Francisco Rodón
2022 in art -  Death of Craig Ruddy, Ricardo Bofill, Tova Berlinski, Alekos Fassianos, Hossein Valamanesh, Andrei Mudrea, James Bidgood, Dan Lacey, John Wesley, Carmen Herrera, John Scott, Dan Graham, Marino Golinelli, DeWain Valentine, Srihadi Soedarsono, Antonio Seguí, Nick Zedd, Conrad Janis, Albert Kresch, Budi Tek, Mira Calix, Ted Mooney, Patrick Demarchelier, Eleanor Munro, Donald Baechler, Jerry Uelsmann, Hermann Nitsch, Cynthia Plaster Caster, Marcus Leatherdale, Enoch Kelly Haney, Ron Galella, Suzi Gablik, Enrique Metinides, Knox Martin, Bob Neuwirth, Miss.Tic, David Datuna, Samella Lewis, Claude Rutault Christopher Pratt, Jacques Villeglé, Paula Rego, Tarek Al-Ghoussein, Heidi Horten, Duncan Hannah, Juan Pablo Echeverri, Harvey Dinnerstein, Arnold Skolnick, Sam Gilliam, Margaret Keane, David Blackwood, Matt King, Lily Safra, Maya Attoun, Claes Oldenburg, Emilie Benes Brzezinski, Jennifer Bartlett, Mary Obering, Velichko Minekov, Issey Miyake, Natalia LL, Marta Palau Bosch, Dmitri Vrubel, Oliver Frey, Lily Renée, Charlie Finch, Jens Birkemose, Virginia Dwan, James Polshek, Jean-Luc Godard. Roxanne Lowit, Brigida Baltar, Billy Al Bengston, Grace Glueck, Harold Garde, Angus Trumble,  Jüri Arrak, Jagoda Buić, Peter Schjeldahl, Rodney Graham, Laila Shawa, Pierre Soulages, Nicholas Harding, Brian O'Doherty, Lee Bontecou, Hervé Télémaque, Tom Phillips, Ashley Bickerton, Larry Qualls, Ronald Sherr, Judith Lauand, Philip Pearlstein, Maya Widmaier-Picasso, Franz Gertsch, Dorothy Iannone, Arata Isozaki, Tony Vaccaro
2021 in art -  Death of Jan de Bie, Kim Tschang-yeul, Arik Brauer, Barry Le Va, Forrest Moses, Cindy Nemser, Bill Hammond, Luis Feito, James Bishop, Arturo Di Modica, Alan Bowness, Toko Shinoda, Barbara Ess, Duggie Fields, Elsa Peretti, Jean-Michel Sanejouand, Gianluigi Colalucci, Jean Dupuy, Mary Beth Edelson, Hans Rasmus Astrup, William T. Wiley, Eli Broad, Julião Sarmento, Richard Nonas, Alain Kirili, Ingvar Cronhammar, Roser Bru, Dani Karavan, Judith Godwin, Jane Kaufman, Douglas S. Cramer, Tomás Llorens Serra, Allen Midgette, Mogens Møller, Gérard Fromanger, Arnold Odermatt, Diego Cortez, Arturo Schwarz, Joseph Raffael, Christian Boltanski, Louise Fishman, Phillip King, Nancy Frankel, Ben Wagin, Yolanda López, Stanislav Hanzík, K. Schippers, Chuck Close, Yusuf Grillo, Billy Apple, Achille Pace, Lars Vilks, Julie L. Green, Margo Leavin, Paul Blanca, Manuel Neri, Nyapanyapa Yunupingu, Lía Bermúdez, Patrick Reyntiens, Iran Darroudi, Raoul Middleman, Bettina Grossman, Dave Hickey, Etel Adnan, Jimmie Durham, Mick Rock, Carlo Maria Mariani, Rita Letendre, Robert Bly, Virgil Abloh, Guillermo Roux, Lawrence Weiner, Eve Babitz, Richard Rogers, Wayne Thiebaud, Sabine Weiss
 2020 in art - Death of John Baldessari, Akbar Padamsee, André Lufwa, Oswald Oberhuber, James Mollison, Hester Diamond, Jason Polan. Beverly Pepper, Anne Windfohr Marion, Jack Youngerman, Peter Dreher, Ulay, John Seward Johnson II, Wolf Kahn, Paul Kasmin, Maurice Berger, Idelle Weber, Dr. Evermor, Anne Hendricks Bass, David Driskell, Alexander Thynn, Helene Aylon, Daniel Greene, Mort Drucker, Gillian Wise, William H. Bailey, Glenna Goodacre, Markus Raetz, Peter Beard, Tina Girouard, Zarina, Germano Celant, Michael McClure, Iepe Rubingh, Cliff Eyland, Susan Rothenberg, Richard Anuszkiewicz, Emma Amos, Peter Alexander, Gracia Barrios, Christo, Manuel Felguérez, Luther Price, Anna Blume, Milton Glaser, Benedetto Robazza, Frank Popper, George Simon, Brigid Berlin, Keith Sonnier, Lotty Rosenfeld, Miodrag Živković, Abdul Hay Mosallam Zarara, Frank Wright, William Arnett, Luchita Hurtado, Pierre-Yves Trémois, Fern Cunningham, Ron Gorchov, Mrinal Haque, Pedro de Oraá, Douglas MacDiarmid, Siah Armajani, Jürgen Schadeberg, Philippe Daverio, Pierre Nahon, Franco Maria Ricci, Donald Kendall, Robert Bechtle, Kenzo Takada, Geoffrey Dyer, Jean Cardot, Chris Killip, David Geiser, Lea Vergine, Diane Di Prima, Mohammed Melehi, Sindika Dokolo, Piero Simondo, Aldo Tambellini, Sheldon Solow, Daniel Cordier, Helen LaFrance, Suh Se-ok, Jackie Saccoccio, James Havard, Barbara Rose, David Medalla

2010s 
 2019 in art - Death of Francine du Plessix Gray, John Mason, Jonas Mekas, Susan Hiller, Robert Ryman, Alessandro Mendini, Marella Angelli, Kevin Roche, Carolee Schneemann, Martín Chirino, Sir John Richardson, Okwui Enwezor, Luca Alinari, Barbara Hammer, Hedi Turki, Jacqueline Lichtenstein, Claude Lalanne, Monir Shahroudy Farmanfarmaian, Jayne Wrightsman, Mavis Pusey, Thomas Nozkowski, Lutz Bacher, Nobuo Sekine, Jamil Naqsh, I.M. Pei, Lawrence Carroll, Everett Kinstler, Tony DeLap, Joe Overstreet, Adela Neffa, Joyce Pensato, Maryon Kantaroff, Martin Roth, Suzan Pitt, Charles Ginnever, Robert Therrien, Gloria Vanderbilt, Peter Selz, Sascha Pohflepp, David Koloane, Leon Kossoff, Douglas Crimp, Steve Cannon, Frieder Burda, Marisa Merz, Carlos Cruz-Diez, Nancy Reddin Kienholz, Wang Guodong, Peter Lindbergh, Francisco Toledo, Robert Frank, Daniel Johnston, Huguette Caland, Matthew Wong, John Giorno, Ettore Spalletti, E. A. Carmean, Charles Jencks, Adolfo Mexiac, Stefan Edlis, Edward Clark, Huang Yong Ping, Gilberto Aceves Navarro, Rina Lazo, Manoucher Yektai, Johann Eyfells, May Stevens, Emily Mason, PHASE 2, Panamarenko, Alasdair Gray, Syd Mead
 2018 in art - Death of Mauro Staccioli, Betty Woodman, Vladimir Yankilevsky, Carlo Pedretti, Kynaston McShine, William Scharf, Ed Moses, Jack Whitten, Robert Pincus-Witten, Sonia Gechtoff, Frank Gaylord, Gillian Ayres, Marcia Hafif, Per Kirkeby, Tom Wolfe, Robert Indiana, Alan Bean, Gregg Juarez, Malcolm Morley, Irving Sandler, Michaele Vollbracht, David Goldblatt. Sabina Ott, Krishna Reddy, Paul Taylor, Irving Petlin, Tchan Fou-li, Annette Michelson, Robert Venturi, Geta Brătescu, Henry Wessel Jr., Jane Fortune, Helena Almeida, Milton Gendel,.Mel Ramos, Paul Allen, Jacques Monory, Harold Stevenson, Karl-Heinz Adler, Stan Lee, Lubomir Tomaszewski, Peter Peryer, Robert Morris, Vivian Lynn, Enrico Crispolti, Wendy Beckett, Jean Dumontier
 2017 in art - Death of John Berger, Antony Armstrong-Jones, 1st Earl of Snowdon, Ciel Bergman, Charles Recher, Moshe Gershuni, Dore Ashton, Harvey Lichtenstein, Jannis Kounellis, Sofia Imber, Fritz Koenig, Ren Hang, Gustav Metzger, Howard Hodgkin, Trisha Brown, David Rockefeller, George Woodman, Mirella Bentivoglio, Julian Stanczak, James Rosenquist, Glenn O'Brien, Barkley L. Hendricks, Magdalena Abakanowicz, Vito Acconci, A. R. Penck, Michael Zwack, Jack Tilton, Felipe Ehrenberg, Marie Cosindas, Trento Longaretti, Edit DeAk, Khadija Saye, Olbram Zoubek, Hans Breder, José Luis Cuevas, Lala Rukh, Kenneth Jay Lane, Arlene Gottfried, John Ashberry, Arno Rink, Pierre Bergé, Pete Turner, David Shepherd, Eleanore Mikus, Robert Delpire, Holly Block, Fernando de Szyszlo, Richard Hambleton, Linda Nochlin, Trevor Bell, Frans Krajcberg, Enrico Castellani, Ivan Chermayeff, Lewis Manilow, Tim Rollins
 2016 in art - Death of David Bowie, Thornton Dial, Charles Garabedian, Douglas Haynes, Bernard Kirschenbaum, Zaha Hadid, Richard Smith, Charles Gatewood, Marisol Escobar, Louisa Chase, Bill Berkson, Kenworth Moffett, Tony Feher, Bill Cunningham, Ben Patterson, Billy Name, Nathan Lyons, Ralph Goings, Shirley Jaffe, Walter Darby Bannard, Elaine Lustig Cohen, Klaus Kertess, David Antin, Leonard Cohen, Kenneth Snelson, Tyrus Wong 
 2015 in art - Death of Milton Hebald, Jane Wilson, Walter Liedtke, John C. Whitehead, Tomie Ohtake, Sheila Girling, Carel Visser, William King, Michael Graves, Bodys Isek Kingelez, Paule Anglim, Sargy Mann, Lars Tunbjörk, Judith Malina, Menashe Kadishman, Chris Burden, Rachel Rosenthal, Rosemarie Castoro, Mary Ellen Mark, Miriam Schapiro, David Aronson, Ingrid Sischy, Sally Gross, Melva Bucksbaum, Nelson Shanks, John Perreault, Brian Sewell, Paul Reed, Wojciech Fangor, Holly Woodlawn, George Earl Ortman, Ellsworth Kelly
 2014 in art - Death of R. Crosby Kemper, Jr., Madeline Gins, Douglas Davis, René Ricard, Joan Mondale, Nancy Holt, Terry Adkins, Lyman Kipp, Leee Black Childers, Alan Davie, Maria Lassnig, Elaine Sturtevant, H. R. Giger, Robyn Denny, Ultra Violet, Jennifer Wynne Reeves, On Kawara, Otto Piene, Sam Hunter, Edward Leffingwell, Marjorie Strider, David Armstrong, Wynn Chamberlain, Jane Freilicher, Jake Berthot
 2013 in art - Death of Ted Godwin, Ada Louise Huxtable, Alden Mason, Richard Artschwager, William Perehudoff, Thomas McEvilley, Merton Simpson, Carlos Villa, Zao Wou Ki, David Hayes, Taylor Mead, Thomas M. Messer, Fred Mitchell, Ganesh Pyne, Sarah Charlesworth, Bert Stern, John B. Hightower, Ronnie Cutrone, Walter De Maria, Ruth Asawa, Stephen Antonakos, John Bellany, Jack Beal, Ellen Lanyon, Deborah Turbeville, Sir Anthony Caro, Arthur Danto, Lou Reed, Frank Lobdell, Chryssa
 2012 in art - Death of Jan Groover, Dorothea Tanning, Mike Kelley, Antoni Tàpies, Theophilus Brown, Anita Steckel, Kenneth Price, Hilton Kramer, Elizabeth Catlett, Louis le Brocquy, John Golding, Bram Bogart, Paul Jenkins, Georges Mathieu, LeRoy Neiman, Mary Fedden, Ivan Karp, Herbert Vogel, Karl Benjamin, Robert Hughes, Michael Asher, Will Barnet, William Turnbull, Jeffrey Potter, Edward Meneeley
 2011 in art - Death of B. H. Friedman, Ellen Stewart, Dennis Oppenheim, Françoise Cachin, Charles O. Perry, Roy Gussow, Alan Uglow, Suze Rotolo, Gabriel Laderman, Leo Steinberg, George Tooker, Stephen De Staebler, Hedda Sterne, John McCracken, Leonora Carrington, Claudio Bravo, M. F. Husain, Jack Smith, Thomas N. Armstrong III, Robert Miller, Cy Twombly, Lucian Freud, John Hoyland, Budd Hopkins, Jeanette Ingberman, Richard Hamilton, Stephen Mueller, Pat Passlof, Gerald Laing, John Chamberlain, Helen Frankenthaler
 2010 in art - Death of Kenneth Noland, Elaine Hamilton-O'Neal, Robert Natkin, Purvis Young, Deborah Remington, Giuseppe Panza, Avigdor Arikha, Craig Kauffman, Shusaku Arakawa, Dennis Hopper, Lester Johnson, Louise Bourgeois, Sigmar Polke, Paul Thiebaud, Doug Ohlson, Nicolas Carone, Corneille, Ralph T. Coe, Stephen Pace, Robert Goodnough, Sylvia Sleigh, Jack Levine, Nathan Oliveira, Nassos Daphnis, Don Van Vliet, Roy Neuberger

2000s 
 2009 in art – Death of Coosje van Bruggen, Andrew Wyeth, Howard Kanovitz, Max Neuhaus, Ernest Trova, Hanne Darboven, Frederick Hammersley, Robert Colescott, Dash Snow, Merce Cunningham, Tony Rosenthal, Hyman Bloom, Barry Flanagan, Richard Merkin, Charles Seliger, Nancy Spero, Roy DeCarava, Robert Borgatta, Irving Kriesberg, Jeanne-Claude, Peter Forakis, Thomas Hoving 
 2008 in art – Death of William Brice, Kahlil Gibran, Dorothy Podber, Enrico Donati, Paul Wonner, Robert Rauschenberg, Will Elder, Cornell Capa, John Plumb, Bruce Conner, Manny Farber, John Russell, Alain Jacquet, Grace Hartigan, Jan Krugier, Guy Peellaert, Willoughby Sharp, Robert Graham
 2007 in art – Death of Dan Christensen, Jules Olitski, Sol LeWitt, Jörg Immendorff, Salvatore Scarpitta, Elizabeth Murray, Edward Avedisian, André Emmerich, Lenore Tawney, R. B. Kitaj, Ileana Sonnabend, Paul Brach, Robert Kulicke, Michael Goldberg, Ismail Gulgee, Herman Rose
 2006 in art – Death of William Rubin, Mimmo Rotella, Nam June Paik, Allan Kaprow, Isaac Witkin, Karel Appel, Richard Mock, Jason Rhoades, Julio Galán, Marcia Tucker, Robert Rosenblum,  Larry Zox, Ruth Bernhard, 
 2005 in art – Death of Philip Johnson, David Whitney, Al Held, Eugene J. Martin, Walter Hopps, Philip Pavia, Neil Welliver, R. C. Gorman, Fritz Scholder, Clement Meadmore, and Arman; Christo and wife Jeanne-Claude create The Gates in New York's Central Park;
 2004 in art – Death of Ward Jackson, Leon Golub, Henri Cartier-Bresson, Cleve Gray, Agnes Martin, Muriel Berman, Tom Wesselmann 
 2003 in art – Death of Al Hirschfeld, Kirk Varnedoe, Wally Hedrick, Emerson Woelffer, Dorothy Miller, Lynn Chadwick
 2002 in art – Death of Inge Morath, Peter Voulkos, Jean-Paul Riopelle, Niki de Saint Phalle, George Rickey, Richard Lippold, Stan Rice
 2001 in art – Death of Fred Hughes, Balthus, David Sylvester, Mercedes Matter, O. Winston Link, Hollis Sigler
 2000 in art – Death of Louisa Matthíasdóttir, Edward Gorey, Jacob Lawrence, Stanley Boxer, Leonard Baskin, Gregory Gillespie; Hans Moller

1990s 
 1999 in art – Death of Paul Cadmus, Patrick Heron, Leo Castelli, Nicholas Krushenick, Stephen Greene
 1998 in art – Death of Richard Bellamy, Dick Higgins, Wolf Vostell, John Krushenick, Chris Ofili wins the Turner Prize
 1997 in art – Death of Willem de Kooning, Roy Lichtenstein, Sam Golden, Theodoros Stamos, Philip Berman
 1996 in art – Death of Duane Hanson, Dan Flavin, William Copley
 1995 in art – Death of Harry Shoulberg, Nancy Graves, Daniel Robbins, Al Hansen
 1994 in art – Death of Donald Judd, Robert Doisneau, Clement Greenberg, Henry Geldzahler, Anni Albers, Paul Delvaux, Sam Francis, Leigh Bowery
 1993 in art – Death of Hannah Wilke, Richard Diebenkorn, Robert De Niro, Sr., Thomas Ammann, Leonard Bocour; Rachel Whiteread wins the Turner Prize
 1992 in art – Death of Maria Helena Vieira da Silva, Francis Bacon, David Wojnarowicz, Joan Mitchell, John Cage, Peyo
 1991 in art – Death of Robert Motherwell, Jean Tinguely, Leland Bell, Dr. Seuss, Berenice Abbott
 1990 in art – Death of Henrietta Berk, Keith Haring, Erté, Joan Brown

1980s 
 1989 in art – Death of Pierre Matisse, Robert Mapplethorpe, Salvador Dalí, Jay DeFeo, Sidney Janis
 1988 in art – Death of Ronald Bladen, Neil Williams, Jean-Michel Basquiat, Isamu Noguchi, Louise Nevelson, Constantino Nivola
 1987 in art – Death of Alexander Iolas, Andy Warhol, Jean Hélion, André Masson, Raphael Soyer
 1986 in art – Death of Henry Moore, Georgia O'Keeffe, Jane Frank
 1985 in art – Death of Marc Chagall, Jean Dubuffet, André Kertész, Ana Mendieta; Charles Saatchi's collection opens to the public arousing interest in Neo-expressionism
 1984 in art – Death of Jimmy Ernst, Ansel Adams, Sir Roland Penrose, Lee Krasner, Brassaï, Edward James
 1983 in art – Death of Hergé, Chang Dai-chien, Kenneth Clark, Joan Miró
 1982 in art – Death of Wifredo Lam, Ben Nicholson
 1981 in art – Death of Isaac Soyer, Francesca Woodman; Birth of Miru Kim
 1980 in art – Death of Cecil Beaton, Albert Kotin, Oskar Kokoschka, Philip Guston, Clyfford Still, Tony Smith, Graham Sutherland, Tamara de Lempicka; Pablo Picasso major retrospective exhibition at Museum of Modern Art (New York)

1970s 
 1979 in art – Death of Nelson Rockefeller, Daniel-Henry Kahnweiler, Peggy Guggenheim, Sonia Delaunay
 1978 in art – Death of Thomas B. Hess, Norman Rockwell, Giorgio de Chirico
 1977 in art – Death of Charles Alston, Lee Miller, Naum Gabo. Centre Pompidou opens
 1976 in art – Birth of Jay Simeon; Death of Max Ernst, Alexander Calder, Paul Strand, Mark Tobey, Josef Albers, Man Ray, Imogen Cunningham, Edward Burra
 1975 in art – Death of Thomas Hart Benton, Walker Evans, Barbara Hepworth
 1974 in art – Death of Adolph Gottlieb
 1973 in art – Death of Pablo Picasso, Edward Steichen, Stanton Macdonald-Wright, Robert Smithson; the first Whitney Biennial
 1972 in art – Death of M. C. Escher, Joseph Cornell
 1971 in art – Death of I. Rice Pereira
 1970 in art – Birth of Jenny Saville, Death of Mark Rothko, Fritz Ascher, Eva Hesse, Roberto Longhi,  Barnett Newman

1960s 
 1969 in art – Death of Otto Dix, Ben Shahn, Mies van der Rohe, Walter Gropius, first Lyrical Abstraction exhibition at the Aldrich Contemporary Art Museum marking a significant return to expressivity in painting
 1968 in art – Death of Marcel Duchamp, Kees van Dongen. Birth of John Trobaugh
 1967 in art – Death of Edward Hopper, René Magritte, Ad Reinhardt
 1966 in art – Death of Alberto Giacometti, Hans Hofmann, Edward Le Bas, The second New York City Armory Show 9 Evenings: Theatre and Engineering sponsored by E.A.T. – Experiments in Art and Technology.
 1965 in art – Death of Milton Avery, David Smith (sculptor), Le Corbusier, Birth of Damien Hirst
 1964 in art – Death of Rico Lebrun, Giorgio Morandi, Stuart Davis
 1963 in art – Death of Georges Braque; Pop Art becomes increasingly popular; Birth of Jon Coffelt, Marco Evaristti, Rachel Whiteread
 1962 in art – Death of Morris Louis, Franz Kline, Yves Klein, Birth of John Currin, Gary Hume, International exhibition of The New Realists in New York
 1961 in art – Death of Grandma Moses, Augustus John; Birth of Thomas Tulis
 1960 in art – Death of David Park, Dean Cornwell Birth of Jean-Michel Basquiat, Makoto Fujimura, as public interest in Abstract expressionism wanes, Color Field painting, Hard-edge painting, and Minimalism become increasingly popular

1950s 
 1959 in art – Birth of Caio Fonseca, Death of Frank Lloyd Wright, Sir Jacob Epstein
 1958 in art – Frank Stella begins black pinstripe paintings; Birth of Brian O'Connor (artist) and Don Yeomans
 1957 in art – Death of David Bomberg, Diego Rivera, Jack Butler Yeats; Birth of Lawrence Paul Yuxweluptun
 1956 in art – Birth of David D. Stern, Death of Jackson Pollock
 1955 in art – Birth of Beau Dick; Death of Fernand Léger, Nicolas de Staël, Bradley Walker Tomlin; Birth of Jeff Koons, Jasper Johns completes Flag, (American Flag Painting)
 1954 in art – Death of Henri Matisse, André Derain, Frida Kahlo, Birth of David Wojnarowicz
 1953 in art – Death of Raoul Dufy, John Marin, Francis Picabia; Birth of Gidansda Guujaaw
 1952 in art – Jackson Pollock paints Blue Poles, and Number Twelve (damaged by fire in the Governors Mansion, Albany, NY in 1961) an influential and large-scale, colorful stain painting that predicts both Color Field painting and Lyrical Abstraction
 1951 in art – Death of Wols, Willem de Kooning paints Woman I,  the Ninth Street Show of 1951, NYC. A seminal event of abstract expressionism.
 1950 in art – Jackson Pollock paints Autumn Rhythm

1940s 
 1949 in art – Birth of Ross Bleckner, Alberto Giacometti completes Three Men Walking II
 1948 in art – Birth of Eric Fischl, Hollis Sigler,  Death of Arshile Gorky, George Ault
 1947 in art – Birth of Ronnie Landfield and James Schoppert; Death of Pierre Bonnard, Peggy Guggenheim closes The Art of This Century gallery
 1946 in art – Birth of Robert Mapplethorpe, Kirk Varnedoe, and Robert Davidson; Death of Arthur Dove
 1945 in art – Birth of Sean Scully, Peter Reginato, death of René Gimpel
 1944 in art – Birth of Odd Nerdrum, death of Wassily Kandinsky, Piet Mondrian, Edvard Munch, Francis Bacon completes Three Studies for Figures at the Base of a Crucifixion
 1943 in art – Death of Chaïm Soutine, Marsden Hartley, Piet Mondrian completes Broadway Boogie-Woogie
 1942 in art  – Birth of Dan Christensen and Tony Hunt Sr.; Peggy Guggenheim opens The Art of This Century gallery
 1941 in art  – Birth of Bruce Nauman, Dale Chihuly, Death of Robert Delaunay
 1940 in art – Birth of Mary Ellen Mark, Nancy Graves, Elizabeth Murray, Death of Paul Klee, Édouard Vuillard

1930s 
 1939 in art – Birth of Spider Martin
 1938 in art – Birth of Joan Brown, Brice Marden, Eugene J. Martin, and Nathan Jackson; Death of Ernst Ludwig Kirchner, William Glackens
 1937 in art – Birth of David Hockney, Ronald Davis, Larry Poons, Red Grooms, Robert Mangold, Larry Zox, Pablo Picasso paints Guernica and The Weeping Woman; Death of Joseph-Maurice Ravel, French composer and pianist
 1936 in art – Birth of Richard Estes, Eva Hesse, Frank Stella,
 1935 in art – Birth of Jim Dine, Don McCullin, Death of Charles Demuth, Paul Signac
 1934 in art – Birth of Brian O'Doherty aka Patrick Ireland
 1933 in art – Birth of Sam Gilliam, Yoko Ono, Franco Fontana, James Rosenquist, Dan Flavin
 1932 in art – Birth of Howard Hodgkin, Paul Caponigro, Nam June Paik, Wolf Vostell
 1931 in art – Births of Frank Auerbach, Bridget Riley, Tom Wesselmann, Salvador Dalí paints The Persistence of Memory
 1930 in art – Birth of Jasper Johns, Death of Jules Pascin, Grant Wood paints American Gothic

1920s 
 1929 in art – Birth of Jules Feiffer, Claes Oldenburg, Nicholas Krushenick, Diego Rivera marries Frida Kahlo, the Museum of Modern Art opens in New York City, René Magritte produces La trahison des images
 1928 in art – Birth of Andy Warhol, Arman, Yves Klein, Helen Frankenthaler, Donald Judd, Sol LeWitt
 1927 in art – Birth of John Chamberlain, Wolf Kahn
 1926 in art – Death of Mary Cassatt, Claude Monet
 1925 in art – Death of George Bellows; Birth of Robert Rauschenberg, Joan Mitchell, and Freda Diesing
 1924 in art – Birth of Kenneth Noland, André Emmerich, Michael Goldberg, George Segal
 1923 in art – Death of Elihu Vedder, Birth of Marc Riboud, Sam Francis, Roy Lichtenstein, Marcel Duchamp completes The Bride Stripped Bare By Her Bachelors, Even
 1922 in art – Birth of Lucian Freud, Richard Diebenkorn, Paul Klee produces Twittering Machine
 1921 in art – Piet Mondrian completes Composition with Red, Yellow and Blue
 1920 in art – Birth of Wayne Thiebaud, Gene Davis, Patrick Heron, Helmut Newton, Elaine Hamilton-O'Neal, and Bill Reid; Death of Amedeo Modigliani

1910s 
 1919 in art – Death of Pierre-Auguste Renoir, Ralph Albert Blakelock, Walter Gropius founds the Bauhaus
 1918 in art – Birth of Elaine de Kooning, Jane Frank; Death of Gustav Klimt, Egon Schiele
 1917 in art – Birth of Jacob Lawrence, Andrew Wyeth; Death of Edgar Degas, Albert Pinkham Ryder, Marcel Duchamp produces Fountain
 1916 in art – Birth of Louis le Brocquy and Ellen Neel; Death of Thomas Eakins; Dadaism started in Zürich
 1915 in art – Birth of Robert Motherwell, Sam Golden
 1914 in art – Birth of Nicolas de Staël, O. Winston Link
 1913 in art – Birth of Wols, Birth of Robert Capa, Ad Reinhardt, The Armory Show opens in New York City. It displays works of artists who are to become some of the most influential painters of the early 20th century.
 1912 in art – Birth of Morris Louis, Robert Doisneau, Jackson Pollock, Agnes Martin, Tony Smith
 1911 in art
 1910 in art – Birth of Franz Kline, Death of Henri Rousseau, Winslow Homer

1900s 
 1909 in art – Birth of Francis Bacon, Clement Greenberg, Henri Matisse completes The Dance, Pablo Picasso and Georges Braque jointly collaborate in the invention of Analytic Cubism
 1908 in art – Birth of Lee Krasner, Balthus, Henri Cartier-Bresson, Ashcan School first exhibit
 1907 in art – Birth of Frida Kahlo, Leo Castelli, Charles Alston, Lee Miller; Pablo Picasso paints Les Demoiselles d'Avignon
 1906 in art – Henri Matisse paints Le bonheur de vivre; Death of Paul Cézanne, Birth of Philip Johnson, David Smith
 1905 in art – Birth of Ruth Bernhard, Barnett Newman, Fauvists first exhibit; Henri Matisse paints Woman with a Hat
 1904 in art – Birth of Arshile Gorky, Paul Cadmus, Clyfford Still, Willem de Kooning, Salvador Dalí
 1903 in art – Birth of Mark Rothko, Adolph Gottlieb, Graham Sutherland, Joseph Cornell, Death of Paul Gauguin, Hans Gude, Camille Pissarro, James McNeill Whistler, First Salon d'Automne
 1902 in art – Birth of Ansel Adams, I. Rice Pereira, Death of Albert Bierstadt, Death of James Tissot, Rodin's The Thinker cast
 1901 in art – Birth of Alberto Giacometti, Death of Henri de Toulouse-Lautrec, Picasso's Blue Period begins
 1900 in art – Birth of Yves Tanguy, Death of Frederic Edwin Church

1890s 
 1899 in art – Death of Alfred Sisley
 1898 in art – Birth of Alexander Calder, Henry Moore, René Magritte, Ben Shahn, Peggy Guggenheim
 1897 in art – Paul Gauguin paints Where Do We Come From? What Are We? Where Are We Going?
 1896 in art – Death of John Everett Millais
 1895 in art – Death of Berthe Morisot
 1894 in art – Birth of James Thurber, Norman Rockwell, Death of Gustave Caillebotte
 1893 in art – Birth of Joan Miró, Chaïm Soutine, Fritz Ascher, Edvard Munch completes The Scream
 1892 in art – Paul Gauguin paints When Will You Marry?; Birth of Stuart Davis
 1891 in art – Death of Georges-Pierre Seurat, Birth of Max Ernst, Otto Dix, George Ault
 1890 in art – Death of Vincent van Gogh, Birth of Giorgio Morandi, Paul Strand, Egon Schiele, Naum Gabo

1880s 
 1889 in art – Birth of Thomas Hart Benton, Rodin's The Burghers of Calais cast
 1888 in art – Birth of Joseph Csaky, Josef Albers, Seán Keating, Giorgio de Chirico, Vincent van Gogh begins his Sunflowers series; Sir Lawrence Alma-Tadema paints The Roses of Heliogabalus
 1887 in art – Birth of Georgia O'Keeffe, Marc Chagall, Marcel Duchamp, Le Corbusier, Juan Gris, Alexander Archipenko, Andrew Dasburg, August Macke, Death of Hippolyte Bayard
 1886 in art – Birth of Diego Rivera, Oskar Kokoschka, Mies van der Rohe, Robert Antoine Pinchon, Clément Serveau
 1885 in art – Birth of Jules Pascin, Robert Delaunay, Sonia Delaunay, Roger de La Fresnaye
 1884 in art – Birth of Amedeo Modigliani, Daniel-Henry Kahnweiler, Georges Seurat paints Bathers at Asnières
 1883 in art – Birth of Jean Metzinger, Charles Demuth, Walter Gropius, Gino Severini, Death of Gustave Doré, Édouard Manet
 1882 in art – Birth of Edward Hopper, George Bellows, Georges Braque, Auguste Herbin, Umberto Boccioni. Édouard Manet paints A Bar at the Folies-Bergère
 1881 in art – Birth of Pablo Picasso, Fernand Léger, Henri Le Fauconnier, Carlo Carrà, Max Pechstein, Albert Gleizes
 1880 in art – Birth of Hans Hofmann, Jacob Epstein, Ernst Ludwig Kirchner, André Derain, Arthur Dove, Tobeen. Death of Anselm Feuerbach; Anton Mauve completes Changing Pasture; Black Hawk begins a series of 76 ledger drawings.

1870s 
 1879 in art – Birth of Edward Steichen, Paul Klee, and Mungo Martin; Death of Honoré Daumier, Thomas Couture, George Caleb Bingham, Joseph Severn, William Morris Hunt
 1878 in art – Birth of Augustus John, Mary Cassatt paints Portrait of the Artist, James Whistler sues John Ruskin for libel
 1877 in art – Birth of Marsden Hartley, Kees van Dongen, Death of Gustave Courbet
 1876 in art – Birth of August Sander
 1875 in art – Death of Jean-François Millet, Jean-Baptiste-Camille Corot
 1874 in art – First Impressionist exhibition is held in a private studio outside the official Paris Salon
 1873 in art – Monet, Renoir, Pissarro, and Sisley organize the Société Anonyme Coopérative des Artistes; Birth of Willie Seaweed
 1872 in art – Birth of Piet Mondrian, Claude Monet paints Impression, Sunrise
 1871 in art – Birth of Jack Butler Yeats, Death of Paul Kane, Whistler's Mother
 1870 in art – Birth of William Glackens, John Marin

1860s 
 1869 in art – Birth of Henri Matisse, La Grenouillère (Monet)
 1868 in art – Birth of Édouard Vuillard
 1867 in art – Birth of Pierre Bonnard, Frank Lloyd Wright; Edgar Degas completes Portrait of the Bellelli Family
 1866 in art – Birth of Wassily Kandinsky
 1865 in art – Work (Ford Madox Brown) completed
 1864 in art – Birth of Toulouse-Lautrec
 1863 in art – Birth of Edvard Munch, Paul Signac, Death of Eugène Delacroix; Manet completes Le déjeuner sur l'herbe and Olympia and exhibits them at the Salon des Refusés to public ridicule and artistic admiration
 1862 in art – Birth of Gustav Klimt, The Railway Station (W. P. Frith), The Turkish Bath (Ingres)
 1861 in art – Manet first accepted by Salon (Paris)
 1860 in art – Birth of Walter Sickert, Grandma Moses

1850s 
 1859 in art – Birth of Georges-Pierre Seurat
 1858 in art – Death of Hiroshige
 1857 in art – Birth of Eugène Atget
 1856 in art – Ingres completes Madame Moitessier
 1855 in art – Gustave Courbet exhibits his paintings including the monumental The Artist's Studio in a tent alongside the official Paris Salon, creating public outrage and artistic admiration.
 1854 in art – La rencontre (Courbet), Ramsgate Sands (Frith), The Light of the World (Holman Hunt)
 1853 in art – Birth of Vincent van Gogh, Ingres completes Princesse Albert de Broglie
 1852 in art – Death of John Vanderlyn, John Everett Millais completes Ophelia
 1851 in art – Death of J. M. W. Turner
 1850 in art – Jean-François Millet completes The Sower

1840s 
 1849 in art – Pre-Raphaelite Brotherhood first exhibits
 1848 in art – Birth of Paul Gauguin, Gustave Caillebotte, Death of Thomas Cole
 1847 in art – Birth of Albert Pinkham Ryder, Ralph Albert Blakelock
 1846 in art
 1845 in art
 1844 in art – Birth of Thomas Eakins, Mary Cassatt, Henri Rousseau, J. M. W. Turner paints Rain, Steam and Speed
 1843 in art
 1842 in art – J. M. W. Turner paints Peace – Burial at Sea
 1841 in art – Birth of Pierre-Auguste Renoir, Berthe Morisot, Collapsible zinc oil paint tube invented
 1840 in art – Birth of Claude Monet; Death of Caspar David Friedrich

1830s 
 1839 in art – Birth of Paul Cézanne, Alfred Sisley, and Charles Edenshaw; J. M. W. Turner paints The Fighting Temeraire
 1838 in art
 1837 in art – Death of François Gérard, John Constable
 1836 in art – Birth of Winslow Homer
 1835 in art 
 1834 in art – Birth of Edgar Degas, James McNeill Whistler
 1833 in art 
 1832 in art – Birth of Édouard Manet
 1831 in art – The Great Wave off Kanagawa by Katsushika Hokusai
 1830 in art – Birth of Camille Pissarro, Albert Bierstadt, Eugène Delacroix paints Liberty Leading the People; Hokusai paints The Great Wave off Kanagawa

1820s 
 1829 in art – Birth of Anselm Feuerbach, John Everett Millais
 1828 in art – Death of Francisco Goya
 1827 in art – Death of William Blake
 1826 in art – Birth of Frederic Edwin Church
 1825 in art – Birth of Hans Gude, Death of Jacques-Louis David
 1824 in art – Death of Théodore Géricault
 1823 in art - Birth of Alexandre Cabanel
 1822 in art
 1821 in art – John Constable completes The Hay Wain
 1820 in art

1810s 
 1819 in art – Birth of Gustave Courbet; Théodore Géricault paints The Raft of the Medusa,
 1818 in art
 1817 in art
 1816 in art
 1815 in art
 1814 in art – Francisco Goya paints The Third of May 1808, Birth of Jean-François Millet
 1813 in art 
 1812 in art
 1811 in art 
 1810 in art – Francisco Goya begins painting his 82-piece series The Disasters of War; Birth of Paul Kane

1800s 
 1809 in art 
 1808 in art – William Blake completes Satan Watching the Endearments of Adam and Eve.  Birth of Honoré Daumier
 1807 in art
 1806 in art – Death of Jean-Honoré Fragonard
 1805 in art
 1804 in art
 1803 in art 
 1802 in art – Death of Thomas Girtin
 1801 in art – Birth of Thomas Cole
 1800 in art – Francisco Goya paints The Naked Maja

1790s 
 1799 in art
 1798 in art – Birth of Eugène Delacroix
 1797 in art
 1796 in art – Birth of Jean-Baptiste-Camille Corot
 1795 in art
 1794 in art
 1793 in art – Jacques-Louis David paints The Death of Marat
 1792 in art
 1791 in art – Birth of Théodore Géricault, George Harley (painter)
 1790 in art – The Aztec calendar stone is discovered.

1780s 
 1789 in art
 1788 in art – Death of Thomas Gainsborough
 1787 in art
 1786 in art 
 1785 in art 
 1784 in art
 1783 in art
 1782 in art 
 1781 in art
 1780 in art – Birth of Jean Auguste Dominique Ingres

1770s 
 1779 in art – Death of Jean-Baptiste-Siméon Chardin
 1778 in art
 1777 in art
 1776 in art – Birth of John Vanderlyn, John Constable
 1775 in art – Birth of J. M. W. Turner
 1774 in art – Birth of Caspar David Friedrich
 1773 in art
 1772 in art
 1771 in art
 1770 in art – Death of François Boucher, Thomas Gainsborough paints The Blue Boy

1760s 
 1769 in art
 1768 in art
 1767 in art
 1766 in art
 1765 in art
 1764 in art 
 1763 in art
 1762 in art
 1761 in art – Birth of John Opie
 1760 in art

1750s 
 1759 in art
 1758 in art - Death of Bartolomeo Nazari
 1757 in art – Birth of William Blake
 1756 in art
 1755 in art
 1754 in art
 1753 in art
 1752 in art
 1751 in art
 1750 in art – Death of Rachel Ruysch, Thomas Gainsborough paints Mr and Mrs Andrews

1740s 
 1749 in art 
 1748 in art – Birth of Jacques-Louis David
 1747 in art 
 1746 in art – Birth of Francisco Goya, François-André Vincent
 1745 in art
 1744 in art 
 1743 in art
 1742 in art
 1741 in art 
 1740 in art

1730s 
 1739 in art
 1738 in art
 1737 in art
 1736 in art
 1735 in art 
 1734 in art
 1733 in art – Death of Nicolas Coustou
 1732 in art – Birth of Jean-Honoré Fragonard; Death of Christian Richter (painter, born 1678)
 1731 in art
 1730 in art

1720s 
 1729 in art
 1728 in art
 1727 in art – Birth of Thomas Gainsborough
 1726 in art
 1725 in art
 1724 in art 
 1723 in art
 1722 in art 
 1721 in art – Death of Antoine Watteau
 1720 in art

1710s 
 1719 in art – Death of Christoph Ludwig Agricola, Birth of Charles van Loo
 1718 in art – Birth of Alexander Roslin
 1717 in art
 1716 in art – Birth of Joseph-Marie Vien
 1715 in art – Death of François Girardon
 1714 in art 
 1713 in art – Birth of František Prokyš, Allan Ramsay, Richard Wilson
 1712 in art – Birth of Francesco Guardi (1712-1793)
 1711 in art – Birth of Carl Gustaf Pilo (1711-1793)
 1710 in art

1700s 
 1709 in art – Death of Meindert Hobbema, Andrea Pozzo
 1708 in art – Death of Ludolf Bakhuysen, Birth of Pompeo Girolamo Batoni
 1707 in art – Death of Evert Collier, Shitao, W. Velde the Younger, Birth of William Hoare, Van Loo
 1706 in art – Death of Luo Mu
 1705 in art – Death of Zhu Da, Birth of Charles-André van Loo (1705-1765)
 1704 in art
 1703 in art – Birth of François Boucher
 1702 in art – Birth of Carlo Marchionni; end of Dutch Golden Age painting
 1701 in art – Birth of Pietro Longhi, Thomas Hudson
 1700 in art – Birth of Charles-Joseph Natoire, Death of Pietro Santi Bartoli; end of Flemish Baroque painting; Possible date of rock paintings at the Burro Flats site

1690s 
 1699 in art – Birth of Jean-Baptiste-Siméon Chardin
 1698 in art
 1697 in art
 1696 in art – Birth of Giovanni Battista Tiepolo
 1695 in art
 1694 in art – Death of Fillipo Lauri
 1693 in art
 1692 in art
 1691 in art
 1690 in art – Death of David Teniers the Younger

1680s 
 1689 in art 
 1688 in art 
 1687 in art 
 1686 in art 
 1685 in art 
 1684 in art – Birth of Antoine Watteau
 1683 in art 
 1682 in art 
 1681 in art 
 1680 in art – Death of Giovanni Lorenzo Bernini, Italian sculptor/architect

1670s 
 1679 in art 
 1678 in art – Birth of Christian Richter (painter, born 1678)
 1677 in art 
 1676 in art 
 1675 in art – Death of Johannes Vermeer
 1674 in art – Death of Kanō Tan'yū
 1673 in art 
 1672 in art 
 1671 in art 
 1670 in art – Death of Viviano Codazzi

1660s 
 1669 in art – Death of Rembrandt
 1668 in art 
 1667 in art
 1666 in art – Death of Frans Hals, Jan Vermeer paints Girl with a Pearl Earring
 1665 in art – Death of Nicolas Poussin
 1664 in art
 1663 in art
 1662 in art
 1661 in art
 1660 in art – Death of Diego Velázquez

1650s 
 1659 in art – Rembrandt completes Jacob Wrestling with the Angel
 1658 in art
 1657 in art
 1656 in art – Diego Velázquez completes Las Meninas
 1655 in art
 1654 in art – Death of Alessandro Algardi
 1653 in art 
 1652 in art – Death of José Ribera
 1651 in art – Diego Velázquez completes the Rokeby Venus
 1650 in art

1640s 
 1649 in art – Death of David Teniers the Elder
 1648 in art
 1647 in art – Birth of Jean Jouvenet
 1646 in art
 1645 in art
 1644 in art
 1643 in art 
 1642 in art – Rembrandt completes the Night Watch, Death of Guido Reni
 1641 in art
 1640 in art – Death of Peter Paul Rubens

1630s 
 1639 in art
 1638 in art – Death of Pieter Brueghel the Younger
 1637 in art
 1636 in art
 1635 in art
 1634 in art
 1633 in art – Anthony van Dyck completes Self-portrait with a Sunflower
 1632 in art – Birth of Johannes Vermeer
 1631 in art
 1630 in art – Diego Velázquez completes Apolo en la Fragua de Vulcano

1620s
 1629 in art – Birth of Pieter de Hooch
 1628 in art
 1627 in art - Death of Cardinal Francesco Del Monte
 1626 in art – Birth of Jan Steen
 1625 in art
 1624 in art – Frans Hals paints the Laughing Cavalier
 1623 in art
 1622 in art – Birth of Luo Mu (1622-1706)
 1621 in art
 1620 in art

1610s 
 1619 in art – Birth of Charles Le Brun
 1618 in art – Death of Fillide Melandroni, Velázquez paints The Waterseller of Seville
 1617 in art – Birth of Bartolomé Estéban Murillo
 1616 in art
 1615 in art – Death of Hans von Aachen
 1614 in art – Death of El Greco
 1613 in art
 1612 in art
 1611 in art
 1610 in art – Birth of David Teniers the Younger; Death of Caravaggio

1600s 
 1609 in art
 1608 in art
 1607 in art
 1606 in art – Birth of Rembrandt
 1605 in art
 1604 in art
 1603 in art
 1602 in art
 1601 in art
 1600 in art – El Greco completes View of Toledo, Caravaggio completes Crucifixion of St. Peter; start of Baroque art period

1590s 
 1599 in art – Birth of Diego Velázquez, Anthony van Dyck
 1598 in art – Birth of Alessandro Algardi, Francisco de Zurbarán
 1597 in art
 1596 in art
 1595 in art
 1594 in art – Birth of Nicolas Poussin; Death of Tintoretto
 1593 in art – Birth of Jacob Jordaens; Death of Giuseppe Arcimboldo
 1592 in art
 1591 in art
 1590 in art

1580s 
 1589 in art
 1588 in art – Birth of Hendrick ter Brugghen
 1587 in art
 1586 in art
 1585 in art – start of Flemish Baroque painting
 1584 in art – start of Dutch Golden Age painting
 1583 in art
 1582 in art – Birth of David Teniers the Elder
 1581 in art
 1580 in art – Birth of Frans Hals; end of Mannerism art period in Italy

1570s 
 1579 in art
 1578 in art
 1577 in art – Birth of Peter Paul Rubens
 1576 in art – Death of Titian
 1575 in art – Birth of Guido Reni
 1574 in art
 1573 in art
 1572 in art – Death of François Clouet, Agnolo di Cosimo
 1571 in art – Birth of Caravaggio, Death of Niccolò dell'Abbate, Benvenuto Cellini
 1570 in art

1560s 
 1569 in art – Death of Pieter Bruegel the Elder
 1568 in art
 1567 in art 
 1566 in art
 1565 in art
 1564 in art – Birth of Pieter Brueghel the Younger, Death of Michelangelo
 1563 in art
 1562 in art
 1561 in art - Death of Paul Dax, Luca Martini
 1560 in art

1550s 
 1559 in art –
 1558 in art –
 1557 in art –
 1556 in art – Death of Girolamo da Carpi
 1555 in art –
 1554 in art –
 1553 in art –
 1552 in art – Birth of Hans von Aachen
 1551 in art –
 1550 in art –

1540s 
 1549 in art 
 1548 in art – Tintoretto completes St Mark's Body Brought to Venice
 1547 in art 
 1546 in art 
 1545 in art 
 1544 in art 
 1543 in art – Death of Hans Holbein the Younger
 1542 in art 
 1541 in art – Michelangelo completes painting The Last Judgment in the Sistine Chapel, Birth of El Greco
 1540 in art

1530s 
 1539 in art 
 1538 in art – Death of Hans Dürer
 1537 in art 
 1536 in art 
 1535 in art 
 1534 in art 
 1533 in art 
 1532 in art 
 1531 in art 
 1530 in art

1520s 
 1529 in art – Birth of Paolo Veronese
 1528 in art – Death of Matthias Grünewald
 1527 in art – Birth of Giuseppe Arcimboldo, Death of Niccolò Machiavelli; Hans Holbein the Younger completes his Portrait of Sir Thomas More
 1526 in art
 1525 in art – Birth of Pieter Bruegel the Elder
 1524 in art
 1523 in art
 1522 in art
 1521 in art
 1520 in art – Death of Raphael; start of Mannerism art period

1510s 
 1519 in art – Death of Leonardo da Vinci
 1518 in art – Birth of Tintoretto
 1517 in art
 1516 in art – Death of Hieronymus Bosch
 1515 in art – Matthias Grünewald completes the Isenheim Altarpiece
 1514 in art
 1513 in art
 1512 in art – Michelangelo completes painting the Sistine Chapel ceiling, Birth of Niccolò dell'Abbate
 1511 in art
 1510 in art – Birth of François Clouet, Death of Sandro Botticelli

1500s 
 1509 in art
 1508 in art
 1507 in art
 1506 in art – Leonardo da Vinci completes the Mona Lisa (approximately)
 1505 in art
 1504 in art – Michelangelo completes the David, Hieronymus Bosch completes The Garden of Earthly Delights
 1503 in art – Birth of Agnolo di Cosimo
 1502 in art
 1501 in art – Birth of Girolamo da Carpi
 1500 in art – Birth of Benvenuto Cellini

1490s 
 1499 in art – Michelangelo completes the Pietà
 1498 in art – Leonardo da Vinci completes The Last Supper
 1497 in art – Birth of Hans Holbein the Younger
 1496 in art
 1495 in art – Tilman Riemenschneider sculpts Seated Bishop
 1494 in art – Birth of Ambrosius Holbein, Jacopo Pontormo; Death of Domenico Ghirlandaio
 1493 in art
 1492 in art – Death of Piero della Francesca
 1491 in art
 1490 in art – Birth of Hans Dürer, Hieronymus Bosch completes the Haywain Triptych

1480s 
 1489 in art – Death of Simon Marmion
 1488 in art
 1487 in art
 1486 in art
 1485 in art – Birth of Sebastiano del Piombo, Titian,
 1484 in art
 1483 in art – Birth of Raphael
 1482 in art
 1481 in art – Death of Jean Fouquet
 1480 in art – Birth of Hans Baldung

1470s 
 1479 in art
 1478 in art
 1477 in art
 1476 in art
 1475 in art – Birth of Michelangelo, death of Paolo Uccello
 1474 in art
 1473 in art
 1472 in art
 1471 in art
 1470 in art – Paolo Uccello completes Saint George and the Dragon; Birth of Matthias Grünewald

1460s
 1469 in art
 1468 in art
 1467 in art
 1466 in art – Death of Donatello
 1465 in art
 1464 in art – Death of Rogier van der Weyden
 1463 in art
 1462 in art – Birth of Piero di Cosimo
 1461 in art
 1460 in art – Paolo Uccello completes The Battle of San Romano

1450s 
 1459 in art
 1458 in art
 1457 in art
 1456 in art
 1455 in art – Death of Fra Angelico, Lorenzo Ghiberti
 1454 in art
 1453 in art
 1452 in art – Braque Triptych by Rogier van der Weyden, Melun Diptych by Jean Fouquet; Birth of Leonardo da Vinci
 1451 in art – Fra Angelico completes the frescoes of the Niccoline Chapel
 1450 in art – Birth of Hieronymus Bosch; Death of Stefano di Giovanni (Sassetta); David with the Head of Goliath by Andrea del Castagno

1440s 
 1449 in art – Birth of Domenico Ghirlandaio
 1448 in art
 1447 in art – Death of Masolino da Panicale
 1446 in art – Birth of Pietro Perugino
 1445 in art – The Seven Sacraments Altarpiece by Rogier van der Weyden; Birth of Sandro Botticelli
 1444 in art – The Miraculous Draft of Fishes by Konrad Witz; Death of Robert Campin
 1443 in art
 1442 in art
 1441 in art – Death of Jan van Eyck
 1440 in art – Robert Campin completes The Annunciation

1430s 
 1439 in art – Jan van Eyck completes Portrait of Margaret van Eyck; Birth of Cosimo Rosselli
 1438 in art – Jan van Eyck completes Madonna in the Church; Fra Angelico completes the San Marco Altarpiece
 1437 in art – Jan van Eyck completes the Dresden Triptych
 1436 in art – Paolo Uccello completes the Funerary Monument to Sir John Hawkwood
 1435 in art – The Werl Triptych by Robert Campin; The Madonna of Chancellor Rolin by Jan van Eyck; The Descent from the Cross by Rogier van der Weyden
 1434 in art – Jan van Eyck completes the Arnolfini Portrait, The Annunciation, and The Virgin and Child with Canon van der Paele
 1433 in art – Portrait of a Man in a Turban by Jan van Eyck; The Annunciation of Cortona by Fra Angelico
 1432 in art – Jan van Eyck completes Ghent Altarpiece and Léal Souvenir; Fra Angelico completes the Deposition of Christ
 1431 in art – Jan van Eyck completes the Portrait of Cardinal Niccolò Albergati; Birth of Andrea Mantegna
 1430 in art – Jan van Eyck completes Portrait of a Man with a Blue Chaperon and the Crucifixion and Last Judgment diptych; Birth of Carlo Crivelli, Hans Memling, end of Medieval art art period

1420s 
 1429 in art
 1428 in art – Jan van Eyck completes Portrait of Isabella of Portugal; Death of Masaccio
 1427 in art
 1426 in art – Sassetta completes St. Anthony Beaten by Devils
 1425 in art – The Mérode Altarpiece by Robert Campin; Birth of Simon Marmion
 1424 in art – Virgin and Child with Saint Anne by Masaccio and Masolino da Panicale; Fra Angelico completes the Fiesole Altarpiece
 1423 in art
 1422 in art
 1421 in art
 1420 in art – Jan van Eyck is estimated to have completed Woman Bathing; Birth of Piero della Francesca, Jean Fouquet

1410s 
 1419 in art
 1418 in art
 1417 in art –
 1416 in art
 1415 in art
 1414 in art
 1413 in art
 1412 in art
 1411 in art
 1410 in art – The Three Marys at the Tomb by Hubert van Eyck; Death of Theophanes the Greek

1400s
 1409 in art
 1408 in art – The Transfiguration of Jesus by Theophanes the Greek; David (Donatello) by Donatello
 1407 in art
 1406 in art – Birth of Fillipo Lippi
\
 1405 in art
 1404 in art
 1403 in art
 1402 in art
 1401 in art – Birth of Masaccio
 1400 in art – Birth of Bernat Martorell, Start of Quattrocento

1390s
 1399 in art – Birth of Rogier van der Weyden, Completion of the Wilton Diptych (Artist unknown)
 1398 in art – Birth of Konrad Witz
 1397 in art – Birth of Paolo Uccello
 1396 in art
 1395 in art – Birth of Fra Angelico
 1394 in art
 1393 in art
 1392 in art – Birth of Sassetta
 1391 in art
 1390 in art

1380s 
 1389 in art
 1388 in art
 1387 in art
 1386 in art – Birth of Donatello
 1385 in art – Birth of Jan van Eyck
 1384 in art
 1383 in art – Birth of Masolino da Panicale
 1382 in art
 1381 in art – Jaime Serra completes Descent into Hell
 1380 in art

1370s 
 1379 in art
 1378 in art – Birth of Lorenzo Ghiberti
 1377 in art – Birth of Filippo Brunelleschi
 1376 in art
 1375 in art – Birth of Robert Campin
 1374 in art – Death of Petrarch
 1373 in art
 1372 in art
 1371 in art
 1370 in art

1360s 
 1369 in art
 1368 in art
 1367 in art
 1366 in art – Birth of Hubert van Eyck
 1365 in art
 1364 in art
 1363 in art
 1362 in art
 1361 in art
 1360 in art

1350s 
 1359 in art
 1358 in art
 1357 in art
 1356 in art
 1355 in art – Birth of Melchior Broederlam
 1354 in art
 1353 in art
 1352 in art
 1351 in art
 1350 in art

1340s
 1349 in art
 1348 in art – Dwelling in the Fuchun Mountains by Huang Gongwang; Death of Ambrogio Lorenzetti, Pietro Lorenzetti
 1347 in art
 1346 in art
 1345 in art
 1344 in art – Death of Simone Martini
 1343 in art
 1342 in art
 1341 in art
 1340 in art – Birth of Theophanes the Greek

1330s
 1339 in art – The Allegory of Good and Bad Government is finished by Ambrogio Lorenzetti
 1338 in art
 1337 in art – Death of Giotto di Bondone
 1336 in art
 1335 in art
 1334 in art
 1333 in art – The Annunciation with St. Margaret and St. Ansanus
 1332 in art
 1331 in art
 1330 in art

1320s 
 1329 in art
 1328 in art
 1327 in art
 1326 in art
 1325 in art – Birth of Puccio Capanna
 1324 in art
 1323 in art
 1322 in art
 1321 in art
 1320 in art

1310s
 1319 in art – Death of Duccio di Buoninsegna
 1318 in art
 1317 in art
 1316 in art
 1315 in art - Death of Giovanni Pisano (c.)
 1314 in art
 1313 in art
 1312 in art
 1311 in art
 1310 in art

1300s
 1309 in art
 1308 in art – Maestà by Duccio di Buoninsegna
 1307 in art
 1306 in art
 1305 in art – The Scrovegni Chapel frescoes are made by Giotto
 1304 in art – Birth of Petrarch
 1303 in art
 1302 in art – Death of Cimabue (exact date unknown)
 1301 in art
 1300 in art

1290s
 1299 in art
 1298 in art
 1297 in art
 1296 in art
 1295 in art – The Muisca raft
 1294 in art
 1293 in art
 1292 in art
 1291 in art
 1290 in art – Birth of Ambrogio Lorenzetti

1280s
 1289 in art
 1288 in art
 1287 in art
 1286 in art
 1285 in art – Rucellai Madonna by Duccio di Buoninsegnia
 1284 in art – Birth of Simone Martini, Nicola Pisano
 1283 in art
 1282 in art
 1281 in art
 1280 in art – Birth of Pietro Lorenzetti

1270s
 1279 in art
 1278 in art
 1277 in art
 1276 in art – Death of Coppo di Marcovaldo
 1275 in art
 1274 in art
 1273 in art
 1272 in art
 1271 in art
 1270 in art

1260s
 1269 in art
 1268 in art
 1267 in art – Birth of Giotto di Bondone (exact date unknown)
 1266 in art
 1265 in art
 1264 in art
 1263 in art
 1262 in art
 1261 in art
 1260 in art

1250s
 1259 in art
 1258 in art
 1257 in art
 1256 in art
 1255 in art – Birth of Duccio di Buoninsegna
 1254 in art
 1253 in art
 1252 in art
 1251 in art
 1250 in art – Earliest date of the Moai of Easter Island

1240s
 1249 in art – Death of Wuzhun Shifan (Chinese; (b.1178))
 1248 in art
 1247 in art
 1246 in art
 1245 in art
 1244 in art
 1243 in art
 1242 in art
 1241 in art
 1240 in art – Birth of Cimabue (exact date unknown)

1230s
 1239 in art – Birth of Gaddo Gaddi
 1238 in art
 1237 in art
 1236 in art
 1235 in art
 1234 in art
 1233 in art
 1232 in art
 1231 in art
 1230 in art

1220s
 1229 in art
 1228 in art
 1227 in art
 1226 in art
 1225 in art – Nicholas of Verdun's The Shrine of the Three Kings is completed; Birth of Coppo di Marcovaldo
 1224 in art
 1223 in art – Death of Unkei
 1222 in art
 1221 in art
 1220 in art

1210s
 1219 in art
 1218 in art
 1217 in art
 1216 in art
 1215 in art – Birth of Bonaventura Berlinghieri
 1214 in art
 1213 in art
 1212 in art
 1211 in art
 1210 in art

1200s
 1209 in art
 1208 in art
 1207 in art
 1206 in art
 1205 in art – The Legend of the Seven Sleepers of Ephesus stained glass done for Rouen Cathedral
 1204 in art
 1203 in art
 1202 in art
 1201 in art
 1200 in art

1190s
 1199 in art
 1198 in art
 1197 in art
 1196 in art
 1195 in art – Birth of Xia Gui
 1194 in art
 1193 in art
 1192 in art
 1191 in art
 1190 in art

1180s
 1189 in art
 1188 in art
 1187 in art
 1186 in art
 1185 in art
 1184 in art
 1183 in art
 1182 in art
 1181 in art
 1180 in art – Birth of Giunta Pisano

1170s
 1179 in art
 1178 in art – Birth of Wuzhun Shifan
 1177 in art
 1176 in art
 1175 in art
 1174 in art
 1173 in art
 1172 in art
 1171 in art
 1170 in art

1160s
 1169 in art
 1168 in art
 1167 in art
 1166 in art
 1165 in art
 1164 in art
 1163 in art
 1162 in art
 1161 in art
 1160 in art – Birth of Ma Yuan

1150s
 1159 in art
 1158 in art
 1157 in art
 1156 in art
 1155 in art
 1154 in art
 1153 in art
 1152 in art
 1151 in art – Birth of Unkei
 1150 in art

1140s
 1149 in art
 1148 in art
 1147 in art
 1146 in art
 1145 in art – Death of Zhang Zeduan
 1144 in art
 1143 in art
 1142 in art
 1141 in art
 1140 in art

1130s
 1139 in art
 1138 in art
 1137 in art
 1136 in art
 1135 in art
 1134 in art
 1133 in art
 1132 in art
 1131 in art
 1130 in art – Birth of Nicholas of Verdun

1120s
 1129 in art
 1128 in art
 1127 in art
 1126 in art
 1125 in art
 1124 in art – Li Tang paints Wind in the Pines Amid Ten Thousand Valleys
 1123 in art
 1122 in art
 1121 in art
 1120 in art – The Genji Monogatari Emaki is produced.

1110s
 1119 in art – Death of Wang Ximeng
 1118 in art
 1117 in art
 1116 in art
 1115 in art
 1114 in art
 1113 in art – Mosaic Saint Demetrius of Thessaloniki completed; Wang Ximeng completes A Thousand Li of Rivers and Mountains
 1112 in art
 1111 in art
 1110 in art

1100s
 1109 in art
 1108 in art
 1107 in art
 1106 in art – Death of Li Gonglin
 1105 in art – Death of Huang Tingjian
 1104 in art
 1103 in art
 1102 in art
 1101 in art – Death of Su Shi
 1100 in art – Construction of Jaketown in Mississippi.

1090s
 1099 in art
 1098 in art
 1097 in art
 1096 in art
 1095 in art
 1094 in art
 1093 in art
 1092 in art
 1091 in art
 1090 in art – Death of Guo Xi

1080s
 1089 in art
 1088 in art
 1087 in art
 1086 in art
 1085 in art – Zhang Zeduan finishes Along the River During the Qingming Festival
 1084 in art
 1083 in art
 1082 in art – Birth of Huizong of Song
 1081 in art
 1080 in art

1070s
 1079 in art – Death of Wen Tong
 1078 in art
 1077 in art
 1076 in art
 1075 in art
 1074 in art – Guo Xi paints Early Spring
 1073 in art
 1072 in art
 1071 in art
 1070 in art

1060s
 1069 in art
 1068 in art
 1067 in art
 1066 in art
 1065 in art
 1064 in art
 1063 in art
 1062 in art
 1061 in art – Cui Bai paints Double Happiness
 1060 in art

1050s
 1059 in art
 1058 in art
 1057 in art
 1056 in art
 1055 in art
 1054 in art
 1053 in art
 1052 in art
 1051 in art – Death of Xu Daoning
 1050 in art

1040s
 1049 in art – Birth of Li Gonglin
 1048 in art
 1047 in art
 1046 in art
 1045 in art – Birth of Huang Tingjian
 1044 in art
 1043 in art
 1042 in art
 1041 in art
 1040 in art

1030s
 1039 in art
 1038 in art
 1037 in art – Birth of Su Shi
 1036 in art
 1035 in art
 1034 in art
 1033 in art
 1032 in art
 1031 in art
 1030 in art

1020s
 1029 in art
 1028 in art
 1027 in art
 1026 in art
 1025 in art
 1024 in art
 1023 in art
 1022 in art
 1021 in art
 1020 in art – Birth of Guo Xi

1010s
 1019 in art – Birth of Wen Tong
 1018 in art
 1017 in art
 1016 in art
 1015 in art
 1014 in art
 1013 in art
 1012 in art
 1011 in art
 1010 in art

1000s
 1009 in art
 1008 in art
 1007 in art
 1006 in art
 1005 in art
 1004 in art
 1003 in art
 1002 in art
 1001 in art
 1000 in art – Birth of Yi Yuanji; Rock paintings at Chumash Painted Cave State Historic Park

Pre 1000

10th Century AD
 c. 983 AD – Gommateshwara statue
 c. 975 AD – Bishop Petros with Saint Peter the Apostle
 c. 968 AD – Magdeburg Ivories

9th Century AD
 800–820 AD – Easby Cross

8th Century AD
 Ruthwell Cross

7th Century AD
 Late 7th Century AD? – Bewcastle Cross
 634 AD – Emperor Taizong Receiving the Tibetan Envoy by Yan Liben
 Early 7th Century AD – Gilt-bronze Maitreya in Meditation

5th Century AD
 Nymph of the Luo River (洛神賦) by Gu Kaizhi

4th Century AD
 315 AD – Arch of Constantine

3rd Century AD
 c. 250–260 AD – Ludovisi Battle sarcophagus
 203 AD – Arch of Septimius Severus

2nd Century AD
 193 AD – Column of Marcus Aurelius
 162 AD – Tuxtla Statuette
 143 AD – La Mojarra Stela 1
 113 AD – Trajan's Column

1st Century BC
 9 BC – Ara Pacis Augustae
 57 BC – Temple of Edfu

2nd Century BC
 180 BC – The Pergamon Altar.

4th Century BC
 300 BC – The Serpent Mound

5th Century BC
 440 BC – The Doryphoros
 460 BC – The Riace bronzes.

6th Century BC
 c. 500 BC – The Nazca Lines
 ? – Hanging Gardens of Babylon

8th Century BC
 700 BC – Sculptures at La Venta and Deer stones in Siberia.

9th Century BC
 825 BC – The Black Obelisk of Shalmaneser III

2nd Millennium BC in art
 1000 BC – Olmec figurines and rock carvings at Bidzar
 1100 BC – The Stele of Untash Napirisha
 12th century BC – Stone sculptures at San Lorenzo Tenochtitlán
 1264 BC in art – The Abu Simbel temples are founded.
 1300s BC in art – Nefertiti Bust; the death mask and throne of Tutankhamen; the Statue of Queen Napir-Asu
 1400s BC in art – Anon., Cosmetic Spoon: Young Girl Swimming; The Luxor Temple is built; the Mortuary Temple of Queen Hatshepsut; the astronomical ceiling of Senemut Tomb; statue of Thutmose III is built; La Parisienne, the Hagia Triada Sarcophagus, and the Poppy goddess figurine of Minoan Crete.
 1450 BC in art – Bull-Leaping Fresco
 1500s BC in art – Mask of Agamemnon
 1600s BC in art – The Minoan snake goddess figurines
 1700s BC in art – Investiture of Zimri-Lim; Poverty Point constructed in Louisiana; the Akrotiri Boxer Fresco
 1800s BC in art – Nebra Sky Disc
 1900s BC in art – Karnak Temple Complex
 2000s BC in art – Priest-King and the Angono Petroglyphs in the Philippines

3rd Millennium BC in art
 c. 22nd Century BC – The Statues of Gudea
 c. 23rd Century BC – Victory Stele of Naram-Sin
 24th Century BC – The Dancing Girl; the Pashupati Seal; the Labbacallee wedge tomb
 25th Century BC – The Statue of Ebih-Il; Silbury Hill is constructed.
 26th Century BC – The Great Sphinx of Giza and the Great Pyramid of Giza are built; the Lyres of Ur
 27th Century BC – The Pyramid of Djoser is built; Stele of the Vultures; Ram in a Thicket.
 2600 BC – Standard of Ur is created.
 2900 BC – The Tell Asmar Hoard
 3000 BC – Stonehenge and Avebury are estimated to have been constructed; cave paintings at Dhambalin in Somalia.

4th Millennium BC in art
 31st century BC – Narmer Palette and Narmer Macehead
 3100 BC – Mask of Warka, earliest surviving depiction of human face is built; Proto-Elamite Kneeling Bull with Vessel; the Battlefield Palette, the Bull Palette, and the Scorpion Macehead
 3150 BC – The Tarxien Temples are built.
 3200 BC – Newgrange and Knowth are formed.
 3450 BC – The Gebel el-Arak Knife
 3500 BC – Rock paintings at Laas Geel; Watson Brake in Louisiana
 3600 BC – The Mnajdra on the isle of Malta; The Ġgantija temple on the island of Gozo.
 3700 BC – The Ħaġar Qim temple.
 4000 BC – Rock paintings at Twyfelfontein; Creevykeel Court Tomb in Ireland

5th Millennium BC in art
 4200 BC – Poulnabrone dolmen is erected in Ireland; the Rock carvings at Alta are made
 4500 BC – The Carnac stones are erected in France.
 4700 BC – The Locmariaquer megaliths are erected in France.
 4800 BC – The cairn of Barnenez
 5000 BC – Sydney rock engravings

Prehistoric
 7000 BC in art – Tradition of making Plaster Skulls in Jericho and 'Ain Ghazal in the Levant; rock paintings at the Tibesti Mountains
 8000 BC in art – paintings at Roca dels Moros, the Cueva de las Manos, the Rock Drawings in Valcamonica, the rock paintings at Tadrart Rouge and the Coso Rock Art District, and the Edakkal caves petroglyphs; the Cooper Bison skull
 9000 BC in art – Engraving of Dabous Giraffes in Niger; Göbekli Tepe; the Ain Sakhri figurine; rock paintings at Caverna de Pedra Pintada and the Toquepala Caves; Wurdi Youang; Urfa Man
 10,000 BC in art – The Wolverine pendant of Les Eyzies; First paintings at Tassili n'Ajjer, the Bhimbetka rock shelters, Tambun cave, and the Gwion Gwion rock paintings; the Shigir Idol; the Robin Hood Cave Horse
 11,000 BC in art – Rock paintings at Matobo National Park
 12,000 BC in art – The rock paintings at the Acacus Mountains
 13,000 BC in art – Engravings in the Cave of the Trois-Frères, most notably The Sorcerer (cave art); Swimming Reindeer
 15,000 BC in art – Paintings created at Lascaux and Creswell Crags
 17,000 BC in art – Paintings at Grotte de Gabillou
 19,000 BC in art – Rock paintings at Namadgi National Park
 20,000 BC in art – Bison Licking Insect Bite created at la Madeleine in France; Venus of Laussel; The paintings at the Prehistoric Rock Art Sites in the Côa Valley, Siega Verde, Serra da Capivara, and the Gobustan State Historical and Cultural Reserve
 21,000 BC in art – The Venus figurines of Mal'ta
 22,000 BC in art – Cave paintings at Tsodilo
 23,000 BC in art – The Venus of Savignano
 25,000 BC in art – Venus of Brassempouy; the cave paintings of Pech Merle and the Apollo 11 Cave
 27,000 BC in art – The paintings at Cosquer Cave.
 28,000 BC in art – Venus of Willendorf and the Venus of Galgenberg; the paintings at the Caves of Arcy-sur-Cure, Gabarnmung, and HaYonim Cave
 30,000 BC in art – paintings at Chauvet Cave in France; Löwenmensch figurine
 35,600 BC in art – paintings at the Cave of Altamira; the Venus of Hohle Fels
 40,000 BC in art – Mask of la Roche-Cotard created by neanderthal; Pre-Estuarine Tradition begins at Ubirr in northern Australia; cave paintings at Lubang Jeriji Saléh and the Caves in the Maros-Pangkep karst in Indonesia; the Adorant from the Geißenklösterle cave.
 45,000 BC in art – Rock paintings at Murujuga
 50,000 BC in art – The Giant deer bone of Einhornhöhle
 60,000 BC in art – The Divje Babe flute
 64,000 BC in art – Paintings at the Cave of La Pasiega and the Cave of Maltravieso
 80,000 BC in art – Nassarius shell necklace and engraved red ochre pencil at Blombos Cave, in South Africa
 500,000 BC in art – Venus of Tan-Tan and Venus of Berekhat Ram sculpted
 '550,000 BC in art – The Pseudodon shell DUB1006-fL is possibly the oldest engraving by Homo Erectus.

Art
 
 
Art
Art